Christian vom Lehn (born 14 April 1992 in Wuppertal) is a German swimmer. At the 2016 Summer Olympics in Rio de Janeiro, he competed in the men's 100 metre breaststroke, finishing 12th in the semifinals and failing to qualify for the final. He competed as part of the 4 x 100 medley relay team during the heats, helping the German team to qualify for the final where they finished in 7th place.

References

External links
 
 
 
 

1992 births
Living people
German male breaststroke swimmers
German male swimmers
Swimmers at the 2010 Summer Youth Olympics
Sportspeople from Wuppertal
World Aquatics Championships medalists in swimming
Swimmers at the 2012 Summer Olympics
Swimmers at the 2016 Summer Olympics
Olympic swimmers of Germany
European Aquatics Championships medalists in swimming
21st-century German people